Belew Prints: The Acoustic Adrian Belew Volume Two is the eleventh solo album by Adrian Belew, released in 1998. A sequel to 1993's The Acoustic Adrian Belew, it features stripped-down acoustic arrangements of previously recorded Belew songs. The instrumentation mainly consists of acoustic guitars- but Belew also plays piano, acoustic bass, drums and percussion on some songs. "Men In Helicopters" is performed with a string quartet.

The album contains two reworked King Crimson songs which Belew co-wrote and performed with the band's 1990s incarnation ('Cage' and 'Dinosaur'), and a Beatles cover ('Free as a Bird').

Track listing
 "Men in Helicopters" (Belew) – 3:09
 "Cage" (Belew, Bill Bruford, Robert Fripp, Trey Gunn, Tony Levin, Pat Mastelotto) – 2:25
 "I Remember How to Forget" (Belew) - 3:36
 "Young Lions" (Belew) – 3:07
 "Never Enough" (Belew) – 3:31
 "Things You Hit with a Stick" (Belew) – 2:05
 "Everything" (Belew) – 2:56
 "Big Blue Sun" (Belew) – 2:58
 "Bad Days" (Belew) – 2:58
 "One of those Days" (Belew) – 3:01
 "Return of the Chicken" (Belew) – 1:36
 "Dinosaur" (Belew, Bruford, Fripp, Gunn, Levin, Mastelotto) – 5:44
 "1967" (Belew) – 5:36
 "Free as a Bird" (John Lennon) (Live at the Longacre Theater, NYC) – 3:19
 "Nude Wrestling with a Christmas Tree" (Belew) – 2:08

The Japanese CD release running order is different and includes “Inner Revolution” and “Brave New World”, but not “Young Lions” and “Everything”.
The booklet contains a detailed diary of the work’s progress.

Personnel

Musicians
 Adrian Belew – acoustic guitars, piano, string bass, acoustic drums, percussion, vocals
 David Davidson – first violin on “Men in Helicopters”
 David Angell – second violin on “Men in Helicopters”
 Kristin Wilkinson – viola on “Men in Helicopters”
 John Catchings – cello on “Men in Helicopters”

Technical
 Adrian Belew – producer
 Ken Latchney – engineer
 Julie Schrader – layout
 Michael Wilson – photography
 Stan Hertzman – photography

References

Adrian Belew albums
1998 albums
Albums produced by Adrian Belew